Noah Michael White (born October 31, 1999) was an American football holder for the Louisiana Tech Bulldogs. He was awarded the college football 2022 Peter Mortell Holder of the Year Award.

High school career 
White attended Ruston High School in Ruston, Louisiana. As a senior, he lettered in baseball, soccer, and football, and won the Paul Martin Multi-sport Athlete of the Year award, given to the north Louisiana's best high school multi-sport male and female athlete.  He committed to Louisiana Tech University as a preferred walk-on to play college football.

College career 
White walked-on as a long snapper and redshirted his freshman season at La Tech. He played in 2 games as a redshirt freshman, recording one tackle in 2019. White switched to holder going into his redshirt sophomore season in 2020 and started 10 games. As a redshirt junior in 2021, he started all 12 games. His redshirt senior season in 2022, he started in all 12 games and was awarded the Peter Mortell Holder of the Year Award, given to the nation's top holder voted on by a committee that includes Peter Mortell, who the award is named after. The winner of the award helps endorse a charity of his choosing. For this, White chose to endorse Project 319, based out of Tyler, Texas.

References 

1999 births
Living people
Sportspeople from Arkansas
Players of American football from Arkansas
Louisiana Tech Bulldogs football players